Larissa Šoronda (born 15 October 1995) is a Slovenian football forward.

Notes

References

External links
 

1995 births
Living people
Women's association football forwards
Slovenian women's footballers
Slovenia women's international footballers
ŽNK Mura players
ŽNK Radomlje players
ŽNK Krka players